Niue Soccer Tournament was the top soccer division in Niue on an amateur basis. It was organised by the Niue Island Soccer Association, which as of 2021 had been defunct for a decade.

Champions in 2021

Previous winners
1985: Alofi FC
1986-97: unknown
1998: Lakepa
1999: Talava FC
2000: Talava FC
2001: Alofi FC
2002: unknown
2003: unknown
2004: Talava FC
2005: Talava FC
2006-09: unknown
2010: Vaiea United FC
2011: Vaiea Sting
2012: Vaiea Sting
2015: Vaiea United FC
2018: Alofi Barrel Sport
2019: Alofi Barrel Sport
2021: Vaiea United FC
2022: Vaiea United FC

The following clubs won at least 1 championship (prior to 1998):
Hakupu
Tuapa
Tamakakautonga

Cups
Niue announced a knock-out tournament in 2005. The final, Vaiea vs Tavala was abandoned, and Tavala FC were Awarded Champions.

In 2018, the final was between Vaiea Sting x Alofi Barrel Sport in which Alofi Barrel Sport won, being its first winner.

In 2019 a knockout tournament was announced. The final was between Tavala FC vs Alofi Barrel Sport. In which the winner was Alofi Barrel Sport.

References

3 - https://tvniue.com/2021/03/nisa-calls-special-meeting-to-discuss-the-removal-of-ofc-membership-and-way-forward-for-soccer-in-niue/

External links
RSSSF.com

1
Top level football leagues in Oceania
Recurring sporting events established in 1985
1985 establishments in Niue